Iron(III) chromate is the iron(III) salt of chromic acid with the chemical formula Fe2(CrO4)3.

Discovery
Iron(III) chromate was discovered by Samuel Hibbert-Ware in 1817 while visiting Shetland.

Production
It may be formed by the reaction of potassium chromate and iron(III) nitrate. This reaction forms iron(III) chromate and potassium nitrate. It also can be formed by the oxidation by air of iron and chromium oxides in a basic environment:

4 Fe2O3 + 6 Cr2O3 + 9 O2 → 4 Fe2(CrO4)3

References

Chromates
Iron(III) compounds
Oxidizing agents